Terence Walter "Terry" Rogers (born 26 November 1958) is a former Australian politician. Born in Ipswich, he was a Chartered Accountant and bank officer before entering politics. A member of the Liberal Party, he was elected to the Queensland Legislative Assembly at the 2005 Redcliffe state by-election, following the resignation of Labor's Ray Hollis. Rogers was defeated at the 2006 state election by Labor candidate Lillian van Litsenburg.

Rogers attended school locally at Clontarf Beach State School and Clontarf Beach State High School and subsequently obtained a Bachelor of Business and a Graduate Diploma of Business from the Brisbane College of  Advanced Education, now Queensland University of Technology.

He is a Fellow of the Institute of Charetered Accountants Australia & New Zealand and a Fellow of the Governance Institute of Australia.  

He is the Principal of TWR Group Chartered Accountants with offices in Margate and Woolloongabba., A director of TWR Group Financial Services Pty Ltd and Australia China Freetrade Pty Ltd.

Partner Sharyn Lee Crosby (born 17 August 1967) Box Hill Victoria.

References

Liberal Party of Australia members of the Parliament of Queensland
1958 births
Living people
Members of the Queensland Legislative Assembly
Queensland University of Technology alumni
21st-century Australian politicians